The Beechcraft Model 99 is a civilian aircraft produced by Beechcraft. It is also known as the Beech 99 Airliner and the Commuter 99. The 99 is a twin-engine, unpressurized, 15 to 17 passenger seat turboprop aircraft, derived from the earlier Beechcraft King Air and Queen Air. It uses the wings of the Queen Air, the engines and nacelles of the King Air, and sub-systems from both, with a specifically designed nose structure.

Design and development
Designed in the 1960s as a replacement for the Beechcraft Model 18, it first flew in July 1966. It received type certification on May 2, 1968, and 62 aircraft were delivered by the end of the year.

In 1984, the Beechcraft 1900, a pressurized 19-passenger airplane, was introduced as the follow-on aircraft.

Production ended in early 1987. Nearly half the Beech 99s in airline service are now operated as freighters by Ameriflight.

Variants

 : Twin-engined Commuter and cargo transport aircraft, 10,400 lb max takeoff weight, accommodation for a crew of two and up to 15 passengers. powered by two 550-hp (410-kW) Pratt & Whitney Canada PT6A-20 turboprop engines.
 99 Executive: Executive transport version of the 99 Airliner.
 : Same as the 99 Airliner, but powered by two Pratt & Whitney PT6A-27 engines flat-rated at 550 hp.
 A99A Airliner: One of a kind, 99A Airliner without wing center section tanks; this aircraft has been scrapped.
 B99 Airliner: Improved version, 10,900 lb max takeoff weight, powered by two 680-hp (507-kW) Pratt & Whitney PT6A-27/28 engines.
 B99 Executive: Executive transport version of the B99 Airliner.
 C99 Commuter: Improved version,  max takeoff weight, Pratt & Whitney PT6A-36 (engines flat rated at 715 hp)

Operators

In July 2018, 106 Beechcraft B99 were in airline service, all in the Americas,:

 55: Ameriflight
 14: Alpine Air Express
 10: Bemidji Airlines
 10: Freight Runners Express
9: Wiggins Airways
 2: Flamingo Air, Hummingbird Air, InterCaribbean Airways
 1: Bar XH Air, Courtesy Air, North-Wright Airways and Sky High Aviation Services
 1 Heringer Táxi Aéreo Brazil
 ?: Lake Clark Air Alaska

Specifications (Model 99A)

Notable accidents and incidents
 In 1987, pilot Henry Dempsey survived an incident in which he was sucked out of the aircraft when he fell against a door in the hold which opened. He managed to hang on until the plane made an emergency landing and suffered only minor injuries.
 Bar Harbor Airlines Flight 1808 was a scheduled flight from Logan International Airport to Bangor International Airport in the United States on 25 August 1985. On final approach to Auburn/Lewiston Municipal Airport, the Bar Harbor Airlines Beechcraft Model 99 crashed short of the runway, killing all six passengers and two crew on board. Among the passengers was Samantha Smith, a thirteen-year-old American schoolgirl who had become famous as a "Goodwill ambassador" to the Soviet Union and had been cast on the television show Lime Street.
Henson Airlines Flight 1517 crashed on September 23, 1985, when pilot errors led to a CFIT.

See also

References

External links

 Airliners.net's background of the 99

0099
1960s United States airliners
Low-wing aircraft
Aircraft first flown in 1966
Twin-turboprop tractor aircraft